Snoopy Presents: To Mom (and Dad), With Love, or simply To Mom (and Dad), With Love, is a Peanuts animated special. It released exclusively on Apple TV+ on May 6, 2022.

Plot
Mother’s Day is approaching and Peppermint Patty is reminded that she was not brought up by a mother. Her friend Marcie shows Peppermint Patty that there are many types of families. Meanwhile, Snoopy and Woodstock set out on a quest to find Woodstock's mother, Linus and Lucy set out to make the perfect Mother's Day gift, and Charlie Brown's attempt to make a Mother's Day breakfast ends in disaster.

Cast

 Tyler Nathan as Charlie Brown
 Terry McGurrin as Snoopy
 Lexi Perri as Peppermint Patty
 Rob Tinkler as Woodstock / Woodstock's Mom / Woodstock's Siblings
 Isabella Leo as Lucy
 Wyatt White as Linus
 Hattie Kragten as Sally
 Holly Gorski as Marcie
 Caleb Bellavance as Franklin
 Natasha Nathan as Patty
 Charlie Boyle as Violet
 Jacob Soley as Pig-Pen
 Maya Misaljevic as Frieda
 Matthew Mucci as Schroeder

Production 
On October 19, 2020, Apple signed a deal to acquire the streaming rights to the Peanuts holiday specials for Apple TV+, including orders for new animated specials to be produced for the service. The release date and title for the special were revealed on February 22, 2022, with the trailer following on April 29.

The special premiered on Apple TV+ on May 6, 2022.

References

External links

Peanuts television specials
Apple TV+ original programming
2022 films
Films directed by Clay Kaytis